Simon Watson (born 8 August 1987) is a New Zealand rower.

At the 2010 World Rowing Championships, he won a bronze medal in the men's four partnering with Jade Uru, Hamish Burson, and David Eade.

References

1987 births
Living people
New Zealand male rowers
World Rowing Championships medalists for New Zealand